The Global Action Fund for Fungal Infections (GAFFI), is an international foundation focussed on raising awareness of and collecting worldwide data on fungal disease. Its aim is to make reliable and inexpensive diagnostic tests widely available.

In 2015, GAFFI proposed action to make affordable fungal diagnostic tests and antifungal treatments available to 95% of the world's population by 2025. In 2018 GAFFI calculated that globally around one billion people have fungal infections of the skin, more than one million people become blind from fungal keratitis, more than 10 million people develop lung disease after breathing in fungal spores, and more than 300 million people have a severe fungal infection every year, of whom over 1.5 million die.

Location and members
The GAFFI is based in Switzerland and the United Kingdom. Its chief executive is David Denning, professor of infectious diseases and global health at the University of Manchester, UK. Emma Orefuwa is one of its executives, and also chief executive of GAFFI Kenya. Its advisors include Arunaloke Chakrabarti from India as well as individuals from the United States, Australia, Spain, Norway, Brazil and Japan.

Aims
GAFFI is an international foundation focussed on raising awareness of and collecting worldwide data on fungal disease. Its aim is to get reliable and inexpensive diagnostic tests to be widely available, particularly in low and middle income countries. The tests can be produced but the increasing cost of regulatory approval causes difficulty in getting them from the experimental stage in the laboratory to real world use in clinics.

Activities
The GAFFI collects data on fungal diseases.

The GAFFI was launched in India in 2014. In 2015, diagnostic tests and antifungal treatments were available for 33–50% of people with severe fungal disease. That year GAFFI proposed action to make fungal diagnostic tests and antifungal treatments available to 95% of the world's population by 2025. Six actions were proposed:
 Provide rapid diagnostic tests that do not rely on culture, and that are affordable.
 Establish at least one laboratory in each country, led by fungal disease experts
 Create clinical guidelines and teaching programmes
 Better distribution of antifungal medicines on the WHO Model List of Essential Medicines
 Establish fungal infection surveillance systems
 Invest in public health mycology

In 2018 the GAFFI calculated that globally around one billion people every year have fungal infections of the skin, more than one million people become blind from fungal keratitis, more than 10 million people develop lung disease after breathing in fungal spores, and more than 300 million people have severe fungal infections, of which over 1.5 million will die from it. It met with the World Health Organization (WHO) prior to the WHO advisory meeting in April 2018 and the launch of the WHO's first WHO list of essential diagnostic tests.

References

Medical and health organizations
Fungal diseases
Organisations based in Switzerland
Organisations based in the United Kingdom